August Underground is a 2001 American exploitation horror film directed by Fred Vogel, and written by Vogel and Allen Peters. The film stars Vogel as a serial killer named Peter, who kidnaps and kills several innocent people, while his unnamed accomplice, played by Peters, films and documents the murders.

Filmed in an intentionally amateurish found footage style, August Underground was met with mixed reviews. The film was followed by two sequels, August Underground's Mordum in 2003, and August Underground's Penance in 2007.

Plot 
Peter, a serial killer, invites his camera-wielding friend into his basement, where he is holding a woman named Laura captive. Peter and his accomplice torture her at their leisure, committing sadistic acts such as slicing one of her nipples off and covering her in feces and urine.

Next, the two pick up a female hitchhiker. After Peter coerces her into performing oral sex, he beats and leaves her for dead on the side of the road. After the duo are kicked out of a concert for rowdy behavior, Peter and his accomplice return to the house to find that Laura has died.

Peter murders an old woman in her home, then terrorizes a convenience store with his accomplice. They abandon their plans to kidnap the clerk or a shopper when they hear police sirens approaching. The two then proceed to tour Roadside America, and visit a tattoo parlor. When the tattoo artist finishes giving Peter a tattoo, he and his twin brother are captured by Peter and the cameraman. They cut a leg off of the tattoo artist then bludgeon him and his brother to death.

The two hire prostitutes for a drug-fueled orgy. Peter sodomizes one prostitute while beating her with a hammer. The remaining prostitute tries to escape. In the chaotic chase that ensues, the accomplice drops the camera, leading to silence in the room.

Cast 
 Fred Vogel as Peter
 Allen Peters as Man Behind the Camera
 Kyle Dealman
 Dan Friedman
 Alexa Iris as Hitchhiker
 Victoria Jones as Old Woman
 Aaron LaBonte as Younger Twin
 Ben LaBonte as Older Twin
 Andrew Lauer
 Peter Mountain
 AnnMarie Reveruzzi as Laura (Girl in Cellar)
 Erika Risovich as Erika (Blond Prostitute)
 Russel A. Sagona
 Randi Stubbs as Black Prostitute
 Stephen Vogel as Boy in Supermarket
 John A. Wisniewski as Michael (Dead Man in Bathtub)
 Nick Yatso as Bouncer at Concert

Production

August Underground was produced, and directed by Fred Vogel in his directorial debut, with Vogel also co-writing, and starring in the film's lead role. Initially, Vogel had wanted to make a "big-budget zombie film", but felt that his inexperience at making a feature film would turn away any potential financiers. With this in mind, Vogel decided to make another film that would help him gain awareness of his work and potential financing for the film. The idea for the film came from Vogel's frustration with the serial killer genre, which he felt "didn't show you what was really going on". Taking inspiration from John McNaughton's Henry: Portrait of a Serial Killer, Vogel wanted to make a film that was both "ugly" and realistic while also being unique and original. Principal photography began in August 2000, under the working title Peter.

Vogel initially hoped to conduct a guerrilla marketing campaign for the film, in which VHS tapes of the film would be placed in random locations around the United States, such as parks and playgrounds, for passersby to discover. However this plan was abandoned following the September 11 attacks and subsequent anthrax attacks.

Release

Critical response

Gregory S. Burkart of Bloody Disgusting included August Underground on his list "20 Landmarks of Found-Footage Horror!", writing: "I'm not a big fan of this series, but I admire Vogel's fearless audacity in serving up the ultimate in onscreen sadism". Jay Alan from HorrorNews.net gave the film a positive review, praising the film's performances, gore effects, and realistic quality. Chris Mayo of Severed Cinema offered similar praise: "August Underground is a true testament of what horror should be; nasty, nihilistic, raw and real". Robert Firsching from Allmovie wrote in his review on the film: "A grueling but important antidote to the plethora of films glamorizing serial killers, August Underground is not likely to find a wide audience, but will not leave those who manage to find a copy unaffected".

The film was later ranked at #14 in Complex's Most Disturbing Movies of All Time, with the entry on the film noting its realistic quality, and "sadistically natural vibe".

Controversy
In 2005, while traveling to Canada to attend the Rue Morgue Festival of Fear in Toronto, director and co-writer Fred Vogel was arrested, pending charges of transporting obscene materials into Canada, when copies of August Underground and its sequel were found by customs officials among the merchandise he had intended to bring to the convention. The charges were eventually dropped, after Vogel had spent roughly ten hours in customs custody, and his films were sent to Ottawa for further observation.

References

External links 
 
 
 
 

2001 films
2001 horror films
2000s serial killer films
American horror films
American independent films
American serial killer films
Direct-to-video horror films
2000s English-language films
American exploitation films
Found footage films
Films set in New Jersey
Films shot in New Jersey
Films set in Pennsylvania
Films shot in Pennsylvania
Films directed by Fred Vogel
Films set in Pittsburgh
Obscenity controversies in film
Films about snuff films
2001 directorial debut films
2001 independent films
2000s American films